This is a listing of official releases by Yahzarah, an American R&B singer.

Albums

EPs
 2008: The Prelude

Singles
 1999: Natural
 2000: Feel Me
 2001: Love Is You
 2002: Same Page
 2003: Wishing
 2003: Blackstar
 2004: One Day
 2004: Rooftop
 2005: Sincere (with Phonte)
 2008: Where I Is
 2008: Orbit
 2009: Your Love
 2010: The Tickler
 2010: Why Dontcha Call Me No More
 2010: Cry Over You (feat. Phonte)
 2010: Starship
 2011: I'm A Legend
 2011: Love Come Save the Day
 2011: What Do Lonely Do At Christmas
 2017: Running

Music video

References 

Discographies of American artists
Rhythm and blues discographies
Soul music discographies